Niels Peder Pedersen (born 15 January 1954) is a Danish sports shooter. He competed in the men's 10 metre air rifle event at the 1984 Summer Olympics.

References

External links
 

1954 births
Living people
Danish male sport shooters
Olympic shooters of Denmark
Shooters at the 1984 Summer Olympics
Sportspeople from the Region of Southern Denmark